A statue of Aristides is installed in Boston's Beacon Hill neighborhood, within Louisburg Square, in the U.S. state of Massachusetts. The  sculpture arrived in Boston .

References

External links
 

Beacon Hill, Boston
Monuments and memorials in Boston
Outdoor sculptures in Boston
Sculptures of men in Massachusetts
Statues in Boston